Heimdalshøe is a mountain on the border of Nord-Fron Municipality and Vågå Municipality in Innlandet county, Norway. The mountain is surrounded by several other notable mountains including Styggehøe, Gravdalsknappen, and Ingulssjøhøi to the northeast; and Besshø and Besseggen to the northwest.

See also
List of mountains of Norway by height

References

Jotunheimen
Vågå
Nord-Fron
Mountains of Innlandet